The Quackenbush Hardware Store, located in Eugene, Oregon, is listed on the National Register of Historic Places. The store opened in 1903 under the name J. W. Quackenbush's, selling farm implements, hardware, and horse-drawn vehicles. Gradually the inventory shifted to kitchen items and dinnerware, toys, and gift items. The store closed in 1980.

The 1.5-story building is of red brick construction in an American stretcher bond, commercial style characterized by large display windows on the ground floor. The architect and builder are unknown. In 1969 the building was saved from urban renewal demolition by a group of concerned citizens.

See also
 National Register of Historic Places listings in Lane County, Oregon

References

External links
 

1903 establishments in Oregon
Buildings and structures in Eugene, Oregon
Commercial buildings completed in 1903
National Register of Historic Places in Eugene, Oregon